

The Nardi FN.310 was an Italian four-seat touring monoplane similar but larger than the earlier Nardi FN.305 and produced by the Fratelli Nardi company.

Development
First flown in 1936 the FN.310 was a four-seat touring monoplane powered by a single 200 hp (149 kW) Fiat A.70S radial engine. It had two pairs of side-by-side seats although an ambulance variant had room for stretcher instead of the rear seats.

Specifications (FN.310)

References

 

FN.310
1930s Italian civil utility aircraft
Aircraft first flown in 1936